This is a list of Garda officers killed in the line of duty since the establishment of the Garda Síochána in 1922. The list includes all Gardaí who were killed in the service of the state (accidentally and unlawfully), as per the official Garda Síochána Roll of Honour. The list does not include members of previous police services or other law enforcement agencies in the Republic of Ireland, nor those in Northern Ireland.

At least 23 serving Gardaí have been killed by individuals or groups associated with the Republican paramilitary groups, this being the most common cause of death apart from accidents.

The most recent death was that of Detective Garda Colm Horkan, who was killed in June 2020, becoming the 89th member of the force to die on duty.

Garda Síochána Roll of Honour
Note: Coloured rows denotes when officers were killed in the same incident.

See also
 Scott Medal
 List of Irish military casualties overseas
 List of British police officers killed in the line of duty
 List of law enforcement officers killed in the line of duty in the United States
 List of Australian Federal Police killed in the line of duty
 List of New Zealand police officers killed in the line of duty

References

External links
 Official: An Garda Síochána Roll of Honour List (online)
 Official: An Garda Síochána Roll of Honour List (archived PDF)

 
Lists of Irish people
Lists of police officers killed in the line of duty
Police officers killed in the line of duty